is a Japanese blog-based manga series written and illustrated by  about a lady who is completely devoted to sake and her many cats and is based on the author's own life. Enterbrain publishes the series in tankōbon format with seven volumes released. Kuruneko has also been adapted into a series of anime television shorts by Dax Production under the direction of Akitaro Daichi.

References

External links
 Author's blog 
 

Anime series based on manga
Enterbrain manga
Kadokawa Dwango franchises